Route 152 is a state highway in the northern Kansas City metropolitan area. It begins at Interstate 435 south of the Kansas City International Airport and ends at Route 291 in Liberty. The route is a limited access highway between its two junctions with I-435.

The original route, established in 1827, was called "Military Road" and connected the Liberty Arsenal with Fort Leavenworth. In the North Kansas City area, Military Road was renamed Barry Road in 1829 after the newly established town of Barry, which in turn is named after the postmaster-general William Taylor Barry. The road remained comarked Highway 152. A short extension of Barry Road, identified as Highway 152, was created between 1980 and 1982. Proper construction of Highway 152 did not continue until 1990. Barry Road, the original Highway 152, runs parallel to the current Highway 152 on its south side on the west side and parallel to 152 on the north side in the eastern portions. According to satellite imagery, the freeway section of the highway was completely finished sometime between September of 2005 and February of 2006.

In 2008, the Kansas City City Council approved a master plan for Kansas City International Airport that called for extensive improvements to the road so it could become a main thoroughfare to the proposed Central Terminal on the south side of the airport by 2025.

Junction list

Future 
Route 152 might be extended to Leavenworth, Kansas in the future.

References

152
Transportation in Platte County, Missouri
Transportation in Clay County, Missouri